Dutch loaf (also called old-fashioned loaf, spiced luncheon loaf, and spiced lunch meat) is a luncheon meat made from coarse-ground lean pork and beef mixed or coated with spices, formed into a loaf shape and then smoked over a hardwood fire. It is a popular sandwich filler in America. Most major deli-meat companies make their own variation.

The name "Dutch loaf" is probably derived from "Pennsylvania Dutch meatloaf", a similar dish from rural Pennsylvania introduced by German immigrants. However, the product is known by different names in various parts of the United States because different makers named it what they wished.

See also

 List of smoked foods

References

Lunch meat
Pennsylvania Dutch cuisine
Smoked meat